John Taylor (born 21 September 1963) is a former Australian rules footballer who played with Footscray in the Victorian Football League (VFL).

Recruited from Albion, Taylor played Under-19s football with Footscray.
 He made just two senior appearances for Footscray, against Geelong at Waverley Park and Collingwood at Western Oval. The ruckman did however impress in the reserves, winning the 1983 Gardiner Medal.

References

1963 births
Australian rules footballers from Victoria (Australia)
Western Bulldogs players
Living people